Piranhaconda is an American science fiction B-movie, premiered on June 16, 2012, on the Syfy Channel. It is directed by Jim Wynorski, produced by Forest King and stars Michael Madsen, Rib Hillis, Rachel Hunter and Terri Ivens.

Cast
 Michael Madsen as Professor Lovegrove
 Rib Hillis as Jack
 Michael Swan as Pike
 Rachel Hunter as Talia
 Terri Ivens as Rose
 Shandi Finnessey as Kimmy Weston
 Chris De Christopher as Milo
 Kurt Yaeger as Gunner
 Christina DeRosa as Rachel
 Syd Wilder as Vicky

Production
The film was written by Mike MacLean, who had written Dinocroc vs. Supergator and a number of scripts for Roger Corman. Corman hired him to write the film.

MacLean said: "I learned from Roger that a cable movie is a different animal than a theatrical release.  First and foremost, cable movies must be faster-paced. With a theatrical release, the audience has driven to the mall, bought a ticket, and fought the crowds for a seat. They've made an investment in the viewing experience, so they're not walking out on the film if it's pacing is a bit leisurely. A cable movie audience has the remote within reach... So you have to keep things moving, which means showing the creature soon and often".

MacLean added that "these films must have an element of comedic irony... the effects still can't compete with the big studio blockbusters. So they're has to be a comedic undercurrent to the story. Audiences are more likely to accept a less-than-realistic effect if they know they're laughing with the filmmakers".

Reception
The film received generally negative reviews.

See also
 List of natural horror films#Snakes
 List of Sci Fi Pictures original films
 In Nessie & Me, the character Jack O'Grady mentions the Dinocroc/Supergator and the Piranhaconda when he encounters Nessie at the beginning of the movie. However, those three films are not related to the first one.

References

External links

 
 
 Review at Dread Central

Syfy original films
American science fiction horror films
Films shot in Hawaii
2012 television films
2012 films
Films directed by Jim Wynorski
2010s monster movies
Giant monster films
Films about piranhas
Films about snakes
Films produced by Roger Corman
American monster movies
2010s English-language films
2010s American films